Respirology is a peer-reviewed medical journal published by Wiley on behalf of the Asian Pacific Society of Respirology. The word respirology is derived from the Latin root respirare, "to breathe" and the Greek root logos, "knowledge". The journal covers clinical respiratory biology and disease, including epidemiology, intensive and critical care medicine, pathology, physiology, thoracic surgery, and general medicine, as it relates to respiratory biology and disease.

In 2020, Respirology was included in an expression of concern from Web of Science Journal Citation Reports for excessive self-citation.

History 
The journal was established in March 1996 by the Asian Pacific Society of Respirology as a quarterly edition. It was subsequently adopted by the Thoracic Society of Australia and New Zealand as its preferred journal, by the Japanese Respiratory Society and the Taiwan Society of Pulmonary and Critical Care Medicine as their preferred English-language journal and by the World Association for Bronchology and Interventional Pulmonology as an official journal. It gradually increased the number of issues to 12 per year. In 2008, an article processing charge was introduced. In 2015, the journal moved to online-only delivery.

An open-access sister journal named Respirology Case Reports was launched in 2013.

Controversies 
In 2020, Clarivate Journal Citation Reports published an expression of concern on a number of journals with extraordinary self-citation rates. Respirology was highlighted for having articles with an atypically large contribution to journal citation metrics, including one article that cited 53 other Respirology articles.

Abstracting and indexing 
The journal is abstracted and indexed in:

According to the Journal Citation Reports, the journal has a 2020 impact factor of 6.424, ranking it 12th out of 64 journals in the category "Respiratory System".

Editors 
The following persons have been editor-in-chief of the journal:
1996–2000 Shiro Kira
2001–2008 Phillip Thompson
2008–2010 Gary Lee
2011–2016 Peter Eastwood
2017–present Philip Bardin and Paul Reynolds

References

External links
 
 Asian Pacific Society of Respirology

Pulmonology journals
Wiley-Blackwell academic journals
Publications established in 1996
English-language journals
Monthly journals